Zatrephes albescens is a moth in the family Erebidae. It was described by Walter Rothschild in 1909. It is found in French Guiana and Brazil.

References

Phaegopterina
Moths described in 1909